Laughlin Hudson Holliday (born September 24, 1944) is a two-star General from Poplarville, Mississippi. Holliday is currently serving as a Pearl River County Supervisor, and has announced his candidacy for the office of Governor of Mississippi.

Education
He graduated from Poplarville public schools, Pearl River Community College and University of Southern Mississippi with a degree in Business Administration. In 1995, he graduated from the U. S. Army War College and in 2005 was inducted into the Fort Benning, Georgia Officer Candidate School (OCS) Hall of Fame.

Career
Hudson worked in the oil fields and mechanic shops during the summer while in college, and since graduating has been involved in a wide variety of jobs in farming, timber harvesting, home building, heavy construction, law enforcement, real estate development, soldiering, and even crop dusting with an airplane. Upon completing basic training in the Mississippi Army National Guard, he worked for the Boeing Company on the Saturn Project, starting as a methods analyst and rising to be the administrative assistant to the manager of Industrial Engineering/Production Control. When the Saturn program ended, he enrolled in OCS at Fort Benning, Georgia, graduating as a 2nd Lt. Today, besides being a county supervisor, he is involved in the restoration of our wetlands.

Personal
He and his wife, have three children and two grandchildren. They are members of the United Methodist Church. Holliday's Interests include government, restoring old cars, flying airplanes, and riding motorcycles.

References

External links
 Hudson Holliday Official Website
 Hudson Holliday Official Twitter Page

1944 births
Living people
County supervisors in Mississippi
People from Poplarville, Mississippi
Mississippi Republicans
University of Southern Mississippi alumni
United States Army War College alumni